Joe or Joseph Cassidy is the name of:

 Joe Cassidy (baseball) (1883–1906), Major League Baseball infielder for the Washington Senators, 1904–1905
 Joe Cassidy (footballer, born 1872) (1872–?), Scottish footballer
 Joe Cassidy (footballer, born 1891) (1891–?), Irish footballer (Grimsby Town)
 Joe Cassidy (footballer, born 1896) (1896–1949), Scottish footballer
 Joe Cassidy (Gaelic footballer) (born 1977), Irish Gaelic footballer
 Joseph Cassidy (bishop) (1933–2013), Roman Catholic Archbishop of Tuam, Ireland
 Joseph Cassidy (priest) (1954–2015), Principal of St Chad's College, Durham
 Joseph Cassidy (politician) (c. 1860–1920), American politician from Queens, New York

See also 
 Cassidy (surname)